"General" Larry Platt (born August 27, 1947) is an American civil and political rights activist and rapper who gained fame with his performance of "Pants on the Ground" on the ninth season of American Idol. The song was released on iTunes and received over 150,000 hits. As of March 2016, the video has received over 10 million views on YouTube.

Nickname 
Platt earned his nickname during the American Civil Rights Movement in which he was an active participant. Rev. Hosea Williams coined the nickname on behalf of his heroic efforts in support of the movement.

American Idol 
During auditions for the ninth season of American Idol in Atlanta, Platt appeared and performed his own original song, "Pants on the Ground". Platt, who at the time was 62, was ineligible to continue due to being over the show's age limit of 28. However, his audition has since become a viral hit, with over 10 million views on YouTube. He was invited to perform the song during the season finale.

On the original series finale in 2016, Platt again returned to perform a few lines of "Pants on the Ground" as part of the show's pop medley.

Discography

Singles

See also
 Sagging (fashion)

References

1947 births
African-American activists
American Idol participants
American Internet celebrities
American political activists
Living people
Musicians from Atlanta
21st-century African-American musicians
20th-century African-American people